The Tower Building was a structure in the Financial District of Manhattan, New York City, located at 50-52 Broadway on a lot that extended east to New Street.  It was arguably New York City's first skyscraper, and the first building with a steel skeleton structure.

History 
Architect Bradford Gilbert filed plans for its construction on April 17, 1888, it was completed on September 27, 1889 and demolished beginning in 1913.

Chicago's Home Insurance Building (completed 1884) was the first to use structural steel, but that building did not fully support its masonry elements on the steel frame. On the narrow lot, a conventional design with load-bearing masonry walls would have left little room on the ground floor, but architect Gilbert asked, "Why can't I run my foundation far up in the air and then begin my building?" Gilbert's design came from a railroad bridge turned on its end. Gilbert made models to convince the city to permit the construction of his unusual design. It was quickly followed by taller steel-skeleton buildings, including the Columbia Building in 1890.

The Tower Building was sold by John N. Stearns in 1905, along with two adjacent buildings, for a reported price of about $1.5 million. In 1909, Morris Building Company, a holding company of Standard Oil Company, purchased it in foreclosure for $1.68 million. No longer profitable by 1913 due to its lack of tenants, it was vacated in December of that year and demolition began.

References

External links
 "The Tower Building: The First Skyscraper of New York City"
  An episode of the 99% Invisible podcast on the design of the Tower Building.

1889 establishments in New York (state)
1913 disestablishments in New York (state)
Office buildings completed in 1889
Buildings and structures demolished in 1913
Skyscraper office buildings in Manhattan
Financial District, Manhattan
Broadway (Manhattan)
Demolished buildings and structures in Manhattan